Euthorybeta is a genus of moths in the family Brachodidae.

Species
Euthorybeta ochroplaca Turner, 1913
Euthorybeta xanthoplaca Turner, 1913

References

Brachodidae
Moth genera
Taxa named by Alfred Jefferis Turner